Sir Frederick Spencer Lister (8 April 1876 – 6 September 1939) was an English-born South African doctor and bacteriologist.

Lister was born in Norwell, Nottinghamshire. In 1897 he joined West Hertfordshire Football Club (later Watford Football Club) as an amateur association football player, making twelve appearances and scoring three goals for the team in all competitions.

He trained as a doctor at St Bartholomew's Hospital Medical College in London, qualifying in 1905. He then went to the Transvaal, serving as medical officer to the Premier Diamond Mines from 1907 to 1912 and to the Rand Gold Mines near Johannesburg from 1912 to 1917. In 1917 he was appointed Research Bacteriologist at the South African Institute for Medical Research in Johannesburg. He later became Director of the Institute and Professor of Pathology and Bacteriology at the University of the Witwatersrand. From 1928 he served on the South African Medical Council. He wrote important papers on pneumonia and influenza and was also an expert on leprosy.

He was knighted in the 1920 New Year Honours, for services to bacteriology.

Lister died of a heart attack in the library of the Institute for Medical Research.

Footnotes

References
Obituary, The Times, 8 September 1939

1876 births
1939 deaths
People from Newark and Sherwood (district)
Alumni of the Medical College of St Bartholomew's Hospital
20th-century South African physicians
Emigrants from the United Kingdom to Transvaal Colony
South African bacteriologists
Knights Bachelor
South African knights
Academic staff of the University of the Witwatersrand
English footballers
Watford F.C. players
Southern Football League players
British leprologists
20th-century English medical doctors
English bacteriologists
Association footballers not categorized by position
English emigrants to South Africa